Rail Pirates (French: Les pirates du rail) is a 1938 French adventure film directed by Christian-Jaque and starring Charles Vanel, Suzy Prim and Erich von Stroheim. It was shot at the Victorine Studios in Nice and on location in the Camargue. The film's sets were designed by the art director Pierre Schild. It is based on a novel of the same title by the Belgian writer Oscar Paul Gilbert, who also contributed to the screenplay.

Synopsis
Henri Pierson, an engineer on a railway running through Yunnan in China, tries to resist a series of bandit attacks on the train. Things come to a head when his wife Marie is taken as a hostage but the local warlord.

Cast
 Charles Vanel as Henri Pierson
 Suzy Prim as Jeanne Rolland
 Erich von Stroheim as Tchou King
 Marcel Dalio as Le mercenaire 
 Simone Renant as 	Marie Pierson
 Héléna Manson as Madame Teysseire
 Lucas Gridoux as 	Le général Tsai 
 Georges Tourreil as 	Teysseire 
 Jean Périer as 	Le Docteur Bureau
 Doumel as 	Morganti
 Marcel André as 	Ulrich 
 Ky Duyen as 	Le lieutenant 
 Régine Dancourt as 	Mme. Lauref
 Jacques Dumesnil as André Rolland
 Valéry Inkijinoff as 	Wang
 Michel André as Brocard
 Pierre Nay as Bernard
 Marcel Maupi as Titin

References

Bibliography
 Crisp, Colin. French Cinema—A Critical Filmography: Volume 1, 1929-1939. Indiana University Press, 2015.
 Evans, Martin. Empire and Culture: The French Experience, 1830-1940. Springer, 2004.
 Goble, Alan. The Complete Index to Literary Sources in Film. Walter de Gruyter, 1999.
 Lennig, Arthur. Stroheim. University Press of Kentucky, 2004.

External links

1938 films
1930s French-language films
Films directed by Christian-Jaque
1938 adventure films
French adventure  films
French black-and-white films
Films set in China
1930s French films
Films shot at Victorine Studios
Rail transport films
Films based on Belgian novels

Fr:Les Pirates du rail